The Odyssey Institute for Advanced and International Studies (OIAIS) Buckeye, Arizona is a public charter junior high school and high school based in Buckeye, Arizona. Playfully nicknamed, "The Odyssey Institute for Advanced and International Studies West of the Mississippi and North of the Equator".

"Scholars", as they are known at Odyssey, (although known as students everywhere else) in high school may wear maroon or black uniform shirts, and black or khaki pants/shorts. In years previous to the 2016-2017 school year, the single-campus was a combination of grades 6-8 and 9-12, but in the 2016-2017 school year, the school split to become a separated middle school and high school. Scholars in middle school may only wear black pants/shorts and a grey uniform shirt. Additionally, scholars are required to only wear (OIAIS) branded outerwear or a solid-colored jacket that corresponds with the school's colors.

OIAIS is part of a wider family of schools known as The Odyssey Preparatory Academy, which includes three K-5 schools in Buckeye and Goodyear.

The High-school and Junior-high's mascot is Marty the Minotaur. The school colors are maroon, black, white, and silver.

School life 
The Odyssey Institute highly encourages Arts, Academics, and Athletics. Odyssey strongly emboldens our scholars to be involved in every aspect of school life. Having our scholars involved in extracurricular activities teaches the skills of teamwork, leadership, and responsibility. Along with those skills, our programs help build character. This school hosts the Full Diploma Program offered through IB and the students who participate in the program often form a tight knit group known as the "Full DP Kids."

Academics 
Odyssey is an academically-minded learning institution. Aside from being one of the 1700 schools that offer the International Baccalaureate Diploma Programme, Odyssey offers quality education in the West Valley. Unlike other schools in the area, Odyssey promotes out-of-the-box thinking, prompting scholars to develop their responses and fulfill depth of knowledge requirements, there is no such thing as multiple choice in the real-world application so there is no multiple choice at Odyssey. The curriculum is centered on the International Baccalaureate Programme (IB/DP) and the grading is based on criterion and criterion strands which determine the grade on an 8 point scale. The school has mapped the IB scoring into a percentage grade with the following: 8 = 100%, 7 = 95%, 6 = 90%, 5 = 85%, 4 = 80%, 3 = 75%, 2 = 70%, 1 = 65%, 0 = 0%.

Arts 
Odyssey offers several art programs including Art, Photography, Dance, Orchestra, Band, Choir, Theater, Show Choir (known at Odyssey as "Company"), and formerly Creative Writing. Odyssey's "Will Power" Shakespeare Theatre group has traveled to Europe on numerous occasions to perform in London.

Athletics 
Odyssey requires that all of their athletes meet consistent grade and attendance requirements to ensure that any Odyssey Scholar is truly balanced in all of their endeavors. Odyssey plays in the 3A Division and has been a part of the Arizona Interscholastic Association since 2015 and hosts 19 sports. The Minotaurs have a fierce rivalry with Paradise Honors High School in football. The Institute has claimed three state championships in separate sports; Genesis Higuera, Girl's Wrestling 132lb State Champion (2020), Joshua Landers, Men's 400m State Champion (2021), Robotics State Champion Team (2018). As well as a national championship in Mascot with Caleb Fine and Talon Bonini (2019).

References
https://www.newsweek.com/insights/best-ib-schools-usa-2017

Schools in Maricopa County, Arizona
Educational institutions established in 2012
Middle schools in Arizona
Public high schools in Arizona
International Baccalaureate schools in Arizona
2012 establishments in Arizona